Holger Lundgren (31 March 1912 – 12 May 1966) was a Swedish skier. He competed in the Nordic combined event at the 1936 Winter Olympics.

References

External links
 

1912 births
1966 deaths
Swedish male Nordic combined skiers
Olympic Nordic combined skiers of Sweden
Nordic combined skiers at the 1936 Winter Olympics
People from Örnsköldsvik Municipality
Sportspeople from Västernorrland County